The Latella 'ndrina are a clan of the 'Ndrangheta, a criminal and mafia-type organisation in Calabria, Italy. They are based in the city of Reggio Calabria, which controls the Ravagnese and Croce Valanidi quarters, allied with the Ficara, and in collaboration with the De Stefano and Pelle 'ndrina. The current boss was also head of the company in Crimine, an apical structure of the Calabrian criminal organization.

Prominent members
Antonino Latella, (arrested in 2010)
Giuseppe Pino Ficara, born 1966 (capobastone)

References

1980s establishments in Italy
'Ndrine